Ravnsnæs is a small village with a population of 583 (1 January 2022), just south of Sjælsø in Denmark. Ravnsnæs is part of the Rudersdal Municipality, and is situated 3.5 km South West of Hørsholm.

Watch pictures and fly-over video at landowner's website.

References

Villages in Denmark
Rudersdal Municipality